Kielpa is a town and locality on Eyre Peninsula in South Australia. It is midway between Rudall and Darke Peak on the Eyre Peninsula Railway.

Kielpa once had a school and a post office, however neither remains. The bulk grain silos by the railway line are still in use for barley. Kielpa was proposed as the junction for a branch railway line to Campoona and Mangalo, and the railway was authorised by parliament to be built in 1916, however it was never constructed, and by 1929, the Public Works Committee determined that wheat could be more efficiently transported by motor lorry than by building this line.

The 2016 Australian census which was conducted in August 2016 reports that Kielpa had 63 people living within the locality's boundaries.

References

Towns in South Australia
1914 establishments in Australia
Populated places established in 1914
Eyre Peninsula